Remote access may refer to:

 Connection to a data-processing system from a remote location, for example, through a remote access service or virtual private network
 Remote desktop software, software allowing applications to run remotely on a server while displaying graphical output locally
 Terminal emulation, when used to interface with a remote system. May use standard tools like:
 telnet,  – software used to interact over a network with a computer system
 ssh – secure shell: often used with remote applications
 Activation of features of a business telephone system from outside the business's premises
 RemoteAccess, a DOS-based bulletin-board system
 Remote Database Access, a protocol standard for database access
 Remote Access (film), a 2004 Russian drama film

See also 
 Remote (disambiguation)